Haret ech Cheikh (also Haret-Ech-Cheikh), is a municipality in the Matn District in the Mount Lebanon Governorate near Bouchriyeh.

Archaeology
It was discovered by Paul Bovier-Lapierre and Raoul Describes who suggested it may be a high place. The hilltop has several outcrops of sandstone slabs suggested to be megalithic building foundation or enclosure. The suggested foundations have big stones at the corners that were not securely determined to be prehistoric. Materials collected from the site were Neolithic or Chalcolithic in form and was possibly mixed with that of the adjacent site of Ain Cheikh. Lorraine Copeland and Peter Wescombe collected some fresh, unpatinated flint tools from a position west of the hilltop enclosure where a large amount of factory waste was also found. All material is in the Museum of Lebanese Prehistory, marked with the label "Ain Cheikh". A grandiose villa dominates land covering part of the hill.

References

External links
www.geographic.org - entry on Haret ech Cheikh

Populated places in the Matn District
Archaeological sites in Lebanon
Chalcolithic sites of Asia
Neolithic settlements
Neolithic sites of Asia